4-Methyl-3-thiosemicarbazide is an organosulfur compound with the formula of with the formula CH3NHC(S)NHNH2.  It is a white, odorless solid.  The compound is one of the many derivatives of thiosemicarbazide.  It is a precursor to diverse organic compounds and metal complexes.

Applications
4-Methyl-3-thiosemicarbazide is used as an intermediate compound in the synthesis of some types of herbicides, for example tebuthiuron.

Precautions and toxicity
4-Methyl-3-thiosemicarbazide can cause irritation of the eyes, respiratory tract, and skin. Swallowing the chemical may cause death. It is classified as a "dangerous good for transport".

References

Semicarbazides